Greatest Hits (released internationally as The Best) is the first compilation album by the British girl group Eternal, released in October 1997. The album contains their fourteen consecutive Top 15 hit singles, which at the time was an unprecedented record for a British girl group.
The album peaked at number 2 on the UK Albums Chart and was certified 3× Platinum by the BPI for sales of over 900,000 copies.

In January 2014, following the announcement of the group's reformation for the second series of ITV reality show The Big Reunion, the album entered at number 1 on the iTunes Hip-Hop chart.

Track listing

Charts

Weekly charts

Year-end charts

Certifications

References

Eternal (band) compilation albums
1997 greatest hits albums